Dzhois Habrielivna Koba (born 26 February 1998 in Vinnytsia) is a Ukrainian athlete competing in sprinting events. She won a silver medal in the 200m at the 2014 Summer Youth Olympics in Nanjing, China.

Competition record

Personal bests
Outdoor
100 metres – 11.97 (+1.2 m/s, Kirovohrad 2014)
200 metres – 23.81 (-1.0 m/s, Baku 2014)
400 metres – 52.79 (Bydgoszcz 2016)
Indoor
400 metres – 55.01 (Sumy 2016)

References

1998 births
Living people
Sportspeople from Vinnytsia
Ukrainian female sprinters
Athletes (track and field) at the 2014 Summer Youth Olympics
20th-century Ukrainian women
21st-century Ukrainian women